Eubrachythoraci is an extinct clade of arthrodire placoderms within the suborder Brachythoraci, armored fish most diverse during the Devonian. Most are considered to be pelagic (open ocean) long-distance swimmers, leading to their widespread distribution beginning from at least the Middle Devonian period.

Phylogeny
Brachythoraci is divided into the large derived clade Eubrachythoraci and several basal groups: Buchanosteoidea, Homosteidae, and Holonematidae. (Although Holonematidae's membership in Brachythoraci is disputed.)

Eubrachythoraci is then further divided into the sub-clades Coccosteomorphi and Pachyosteomorphi, the latter of which can be further sub-divided into Aspinothoracidi and Dunkleosteoidea, as shown in the cladogram below:

References

Arthrodires